Empetrichthys is a genus of splitfins endemic to the state of Nevada in the United States.In 1989 they only had an estimated population of 24800, while its two other subspecies had gone extinct. This species mating season typically falls in spring. These animals are in danger and facing threats because their water is drying out because of pumping of ground water for agricultural developments.

Species
There are currently two recognized species in this genus:
 Empetrichthys latos R. R. Miller, 1948
 †Empetrichthys latos concavus R. R. Miller, 1948 (Raycraft Ranch poolfish)
 Empetrichthys latos latos R. R. Miller, 1948 (Pahrump poolfish)
 †Empetrichthys latos pahrump R. R. Miller, 1948 (Pahrump Ranch poolfish)
 †Empetrichthys merriami C. H. Gilbert, 1893 (Ash Meadows killifish)

References

 
Empetrichthyinae
Freshwater fish genera
Taxa named by Charles Henry Gilbert
Ray-finned fish genera